Partners in Time is a 1946 American comedy film directed by William Nigh and written by Charles E. Roberts. The film stars Chester Lauck, Norris Goff, Pamela Blake, John James, Teala Loring and Danny Duncan. The film was released on April 25, 1946, by RKO Pictures.

Plot

Cast 
Chester Lauck as Lum Edwards
Norris Goff as Abner Peabody
Pamela Blake as Elizabeth Meadows
John James as Tim Matthews
Teala Loring as Janet Smith
Danny Duncan as Grandpappy Spears / Constable Spears
Grady Sutton as Cedric Weehunt
Dick Elliott as Squire Skimp
Phyllis Kennedy as Abagail
Ruth Lee as Miss Martha Thurston
Charles Jordan as Gerald Sharpe
Ruth Caldwell as Josie

References

External links 
 

1946 films
American black-and-white films
1940s English-language films
Films based on radio series
Films directed by William Nigh
American comedy films
1946 comedy films
RKO Pictures films
1940s American films
Lum and Abner